Rafael Candido Moreno   (born February 1, 1995) is a Brazilian former professional baseball pitcher. He represented Brazil at the 2013 World Baseball Classic.

References

External links

1995 births
Living people
Sportspeople from São Paulo (state)
2013 World Baseball Classic players
Brazilian baseball players
Brazilian expatriate baseball players in the United States
Dominican Summer League Orioles players
Brazilian expatriate baseball players in the Dominican Republic